Ron Blaauw may refer to:

 Ron Blaauw (chef) (born 1967), businessman, Michelin starred chef and owner of the restaurant Ron Blaauw
 Ron Blaauw (restaurant), Michelin starred restaurant in Amsterdam